The Chase School is a secondary school (ages 11–18) in Malvern, Worcestershire, England. The school opened as a Secondary Modern in 1953 under headteacher Mr Garth. It was officially opened by Lord Cobham on 26 March 1955. The Chase became a comprehensive with the abolition of selective education in Worcestershire in 1974 and became an academy on 1 November 2011. Teaching students from Year 7 to Year 13, The Chase has around 1,300 students, making it one of the larger schools in Worcestershire, with just under 300 students in the sixth form.

The school is located in Barnards Green, a suburb of Malvern, adjacent to the sites of QinetiQ and the Malvern Hills Science Park. Links between the school and these organisations have led to the establishment of the Cyber-security Apprentice Development Scheme, an apprenticeship initiative aimed to encourage more students into the cyber security sector.

Background 
The Chase School has been a specialist schools programme Technology College since 1999, and was awarded Beacon school status in 2002. The school achieved Artsmark Gold status in 2001 for excellence in art and design, drama, music, creative writing and public speaking. The Chase School is also a Language College (French, German (although German as of 2021 is no longer taught at examination level) Spanish and Japanese). The school has Sportsmark Gold status, awarded to schools by Sport England for excellent provision of Physical Education and school sport.

Former headmaster Richard Jacobs started in 2013, taking over from Kevin Peck who had started in 2002. Peck was appointed when the previous headteacher retired; David Fawbert had been awarded the Order of the British Empire (OBE) for his services to education during his tenure. Current headmaster, Mike Fieldhouse, was appointed in 2017.

A recent Ofsted inspection on 19 and 29 October 2021 rated the school 'Good' with the Sixth Form ranked as Grade 1 (Outstanding). The inspectors noted under 'What does the school need to do to improve?' required improvements that "A minority of staff do not implement the behaviour policy consistently. As a result,
pupils are unsure of how adults respond to different behaviours, and so they can
experience some disruption to learning. Leaders should ensure that all staff
understand and consistently uphold the school’s high expectations for pupils’
behaviour."

The school was named in 2019 as a computing hub for the National Centre for Computing Education.

Buildings

The Chase School library opened in September 2006 and was officially opened on 23 February 2007, by the now poet laureate Carol Ann Duffy. The library is situated adjacent to the main ground floor block. The science block was built and was open in 2008 and was officially opened in 2009.

In 2014 local MP Harriett Baldwin officially opened the new £1 million humanities block, a new build featuring seven classrooms.

Traditions
The students of The Chase School take part in the annual "Hills Walk", a 7.5-mile walk across the Malvern Hills and the surrounding area. The walk begins at the clock tower in North Malvern, at the foot of the Malvern Hills, and finishes at the school campus on Geraldine Road, Malvern. The walk has taken place almost every year since it was started in 1977 to celebrate the Queen's Silver Jubilee.

The school supports a variety of charities and runs various fundraising events, regularly raising over £5,000 each year. This includes the donation of food parcels to residents of local housing for the elderly and to food banks in Malvern.

Achievements
In 2016 the school won a record eighth best team trophy at the Worcestershire Schools' Sailing and Canoeing Association (WSSCA) OnBoard Regatta.

The school's links with local technology companies have enabled them to develop apprenticeships in cyber security. In 2015 a team representing The Chase secured the runners-up prize in the national finals of the UK Cyber Centurion Competition and second in the international competition.

In 98/99 the year 11 football Team won the district cup. After beating Evesham High school in the semi final the team went in to beat St Henry’s in the final played in Worcester.

The Chase achieved top marks in the 2012 Business, Accountancy and Skills Education competition run by the Institute of Chartered Accountants in England and Wales (ICAEW). They have also been successful in Young Enterprise.

Notable alumni
Tracy Moseley
Evie Richards
Cher Lloyd, singer, songwriter
Ed Elliot, sculptor

References

External links 
 The Chase School Website

Educational institutions established in 1955
Schools in Malvern, Worcestershire
Academies in Worcestershire
Secondary schools in Worcestershire
1955 establishments in England